Haas Type Foundry (Haas'sche Schriftgiesserei) was a Swiss manufacturer of foundry type. First the factory was located in Basel, in the 1920s they relocated to Münchenstein.

History
Haas traces its origins back to the printer Jean Exertier who began casting type during the second half of the 16th century, later passing to the Genath family. In 1718, Johann Wilhelm Haas (1698–1764) from Nuremberg was hired. He later inherited the company as recognition of his efforts. After 1740, the business was run under the Haas name. In 1927 the Stempel Foundry acquired a shareholding in the Haas foundry and the two foundries begin to share matrices. Haas purchased the French foundries Deberny & Peignot in 1972, and Fonderie Olive in 1978. With Linotype’s acquisition of the D. Stempel AG in 1985, they became the majority shareholder. In 1989, Linotype shut down the Haas Foundry, retaining the rights to the typefaces, and transferring metal typefounding operations to Walter Fruttiger AG.

Typefaces
These foundry types were produced by Haas:

References

External links
Erny & Schneider, Architekten, architectural plan for conversion of former Haas Type Foundry

Letterpress font foundries
Manufacturing companies based in Basel
Defunct companies of Switzerland
Münchenstein
Buildings and structures in Basel-Landschaft
Metal companies of Switzerland